Gyula Karácsony (born September 1, 1956 in Tét) is a Hungarian sport shooter. He competed at the 1988 Summer Olympics in the men's 50 metre pistol event, in which he placed sixth.

References

External links
 
 
 
 

1956 births
Living people
ISSF pistol shooters
Hungarian male sport shooters
Shooters at the 1988 Summer Olympics
Olympic shooters of Hungary